10 East 40th Street or the Mercantile Building is a skyscraper on 40th Street in Midtown Manhattan, New York City, in the middle of the block between Fifth and Madison avenues, extending back to 39th Street. Designed by Ludlow and Peabody and built by Jesse H. Jones, it was finished in 1929 and is an example of Renaissance Revival architecture. When it was built, it was the fourth-tallest tower in the world.

History 
It was previously known as the Chase Tower, after its first tenant, Chase Brass & Copper. Its owner until his death in 1938 was Frederick William Vanderbilt. 

During the 1970s, the building housed part of the Mid-Manhattan Library. In September 2002, the building's lobby was renovated, restoring the  ceilings. Current tenants include the Moroccan consulate.

Last building on the direct current grid
On November 14, 2007, the building became the final site to be removed from Thomas Edison's original direct current grid in New York City.

The building was completed in 1929 when 90 percent of the electricity in lower Manhattan was direct current.  In that year New York Edison announced plans that it was going to convert the entire system to alternating current. The last 2 rotary converter substations generating direct current (at West 26th and West 39th Street) were retired in 1977 and the DC conversions were handled by solid-state rectifier units.  The 2007 event shifted the responsibility for providing the conversion from Con Edison to the building via a local converter.  Many of the buildings built in 1929 and before still use direct current with the local converter – most notably for elevators. The New York City Subway's third rail electric system is still direct current (with the Metropolitan Transportation Authority providing the local converters from AC to DC.

See also
List of tallest buildings in New York City

References

External links

 Article in Architecture Week
 Building's leasing site

Office buildings completed in 1929
Skyscraper office buildings in Manhattan
Art Deco architecture in Manhattan
1929 establishments in New York City
Bryant Park buildings